Conservation reserves of South Australia  is a class of protected area used in the Australian state of South Australia where crown land under the control of the responsible minister has been dedicated for conservation purposes. This class of protected area has been in use as early as 1985. In 2016 there were 15 conservation reserves that covered an area of 194.7 square kilometres (75.1 sq mi).  the number had increased to 16 conservation reserves covering 193.6 square kilometres (74.73 sq mi) or less than 1% of South Australia's land area.

Description
In South Australia, a conservation reserve is a class of protected area concerned with "(crown) land set aside for conservation of natural and cultural features under the Crown Land Management Act 2009" and its predecessor, the Crown Lands Act 1929. This class of protected area has been in use since at least 1985.

Conservation reserves only concerns land under the control of the responsible government minister and which has been dedicated for conservation purposes.

Declaration of a parcel of crown land as a conservation reserve can be an interim step towards declaration as a reserve under the National Parks and Wildlife Act 1972.

, conservation reserves are managed by the Department of Environment, Water and Natural Resources.

, all fifteen declared conservation reserve reserves have been classified as IUCN Category VI protected areas.

Conservation reserves declared as of June 2016
, the following conservation reserves were listed by the Government of South Australia.

Bernouilli Conservation Reserve
Bernouilli Conservation Reserve was established on 11 November 1993.

Buckleboo Conservation Reserve
Buckleboo Conservation Reserve was established on 13 September 1990. Its name is derived from the "former town of Buckleboo."

Bunbury Conservation Reserve
Bunbury Conservation Reserve was established on 11 September 1993.

Bunkers Conservation Reserve
Bunkers Conservation Reserve was established on 27 March 2001. Its name is derived from the Bunker Range. The crown land was placed under "the care, control and management of the Yellow Footed Rock Wallaby Association Incorporated, subject to the various conditions as stipulated in the Memorandum of Agreement signed on 28 December 2000, between the Minister for Environment and Heritage and the Yellow Footed Rock Wallaby Association Incorporated."

Cortlinye Conservation Reserve
Cortlinye Conservation Reserve was established on 12 November 1987. Its name is derived from the land's previous tenure as the Cortlinye Water Conservation Reserve.

Cox Scrub Conservation Reserve
Cox Scrub Conservation Reserve was established on 11 November 1993. Its name is derived from its proximity to the Cox Scrub Conservation Park.

Cunyarie Conservation Reserve
Cunyarie Conservation Reserve was established on 11 November 1985.

Desert Camp Conservation Reserve
Desert Camp Conservation Reserve was established on 11 November 1993. Its name is derived from its proximity to the Desert Camp Conservation Park.

Hardings Springs Conservation Reserve
Hardings Springs Conservation Reserve was established on 24 April 1997.

Lacroma Conservation Reserve
Lacroma Conservation Reserve was established on 14 April 1988. Its name is derived from the Lacroma Water Conservation Reserve which was located on some "adjacent" land.

Moongi Conservation Reserve
Moongi Conservation Reserve was established on 13 September 1990. Its name is derived from its proximity to "the former town of Moongi."

Mootra Conservation Reserve
Mootra Conservation Reserve was established on 2 March 1989. Its name is derived from the previous use of the land as the Mootra Water Conservation Reserve.

Pinkawillinie Reservoir Conservation Reserve
Pinkawillinie Reservoir Conservation Reserve was established on 14 May 1987. Its name is derived from the previous use of the land as the Pinkawillinie Water Conservation Reserve. An earlier proposal to use ‘Pinkawillinie’ as the name of the conservation reserve was not accepted by Geographical Names Board due to "possible confusion with the Pinkawillinie Conservation Park proclaimed under the National Parks & Wildlife Act." The name was subsequently approved by the board in 1988.

Poolgarra Conservation Reserve
Poolgarra Conservation Reserve was established on 28 January 1988. Its name is derived from the previous use of the land as the Poolgara Water Conservation Reserve.

Tola Conservation Reserve
Tola Conservation Reserve was established on 28 January 1988. Its name is derived from the Tola Tank Water Conservation Reserve because its land holding consists of part of the land used for the water conservation reserve.

Former conservation reserves
The following is a list of former conservation reserves dedicated under the former Crown Lands Act 1929 and which either have been added to existing protected areas or proclaimed as new protected areas constituted under the National Parks and Wildlife Act 1972.

Other conservation reserves
Other places in South Australia whose names include the words "conservation reserve" include:
Mutton Cove Conservation Reserve is located on land adjoining the Port River and including a bay named Mutton Cove in the suburb of Osborne in the Adelaide metropolitan area. Its existence is mentioned in various documents published by official sources in South Australia. However, the conservation reserve has not been gazetted, although the bay known as Mutton Cove is located within the boundaries of the protected area known as the Adelaide Dolphin Sanctuary. There is a ship's graveyard site at Mutton Cove, there being the wreck of a former steel steamship, later used as a coal hulk, at the northern end of the cove, near Pelican Point. After the seawall at the reserve was breached by a huge storm in 2016, the area is now regularly flooded by the river, and is also threatened by rising sea levels. This will cause the samphires to die off and the mangroves to increase.

Nurragi Conservation Reserve, a private protected area located in the localities of Milang, Nurragi and Sandergrove and owned by the National Trust of South Australia.
Tennyson Dunes Conservation Reserve is located on land in the suburb of Tennyson in the Adelaide metropolitan area and which was reported as being dedicated as a conservation reserve by Ian Hunter, the Minister for Sustainability, Environment and Conservation, on 13 September 2015. However, the conservation reserve has not been gazetted.

See also

Protected areas of South Australia

References

External links
Bernouilli Conservation Reserve
Buckleboo Conservation Reserve
Bunbury Conservation Reserve
Bunkers Conservation Reserve
Cortlinye Conservation Reserve
Cox Scrub Conservation Reserve
Cunyarie Conservation Reserve
Desert Camp Conservation Reserve
Hardings Springs Conservation Reserve
Lacroma Conservation Reserve
Moongi Conservation Reserve
Mootra Conservation Reserve
Pinkawillinie Reservoir Conservation Reserve
Poolgarra Conservation Reserve
Tola Conservation Reserve

 
a